The 2009 Montgomery mayoral special election took place on March 10, 2009, to elect the Mayor of Montgomery, Alabama. It saw the election of Todd Strange.

The election was triggered by the resignation of mayor Bobby Bright, who resigned in order to take a seat he was elected to in the United States House of Representatives.

The election was officially nonpartisan. Had no candidate received a majority of the vote, a runoff election would have been held between the top two candidates.

Results

References

Mayoral elections in Montgomery, Alabama
Montgomery
Montgomery
Montgomery
Montgomery mayoral 2009